The Indian women's national handball team is the national team for Handball in India. It is governed by the Handball Association India.

Results

Asian Championship

Asian Games

South Asian Games

South Asian Championship
 1996 –  Champions
 2000 –  Champions
 2008 –  Champions
 2013 –  Champions
 2018 –  Champions

Notable players
Renu Goswami
Mamta Sodha

External links
IHF profile

References

National team
Women's national handball teams
Handball